IFU or ifu may refer to:
 Integral field unit
 International Fruit and Vegetable Juice Association
 Instruction fetch unit
 Instructions for Use
 "IFU", song by Usher (singer)

97grh